A Furrow Cut Short is the tenth album by Ukrainian black metal band Drudkh, released April 20, 2015, on Season of Mist's Underground Activists label. It is the band's longest recording to date and the first to receive a vinyl release on two LPs.

Track listing

Critical reception

Upon the release, the album received mixed critical reception.

Dave Schalek from About.com rated the album 4 out of 5 and said that "a Furrow Cut Short is an excellent introduction to Drudkh for listeners unfamiliar with the band and is, by any measure, an excellent album."

Benjamin Hedge Olson from PopMatters said that the album is "another predictable yet satisfying slab of black metal", rating it 6 out of 10.

Kyle Ward from Sputnikmusic was more negative about the release, rated it 2 out of 5 and "was not pleased that a leader of that scene devolved into run-of-the-mill black metal."

Personnel
 Thurios – vocals, keyboards
 Roman Saenko – guitars, bass
 Krechet – bass, keyboards
 Vlad – drums, keyboards

References

Drudkh albums
2015 albums
Season of Mist albums